Pyrausta ictericalis is a moth in the family Crambidae. It was first described by Snellen in 1895. It is found on Java.

References

Moths described in 1895
ictericalis
Moths of Indonesia